The 1990 Virginia Slims of Nashville was a women's tennis tournament played on indoor hard courts at the Maryland Farms Racquet Club in Brentwood, Tennessee in the United States and was part of the Tier IV category of the 1990 WTA Tour. It was the sixth edition of the tournament and ran from October 29 through November 4, 1990. Unseeded Natalia Medvedeva won the singles title and earned $27,000 first-prize money.

Finals

Singles
 Natalia Medvedeva defeated  Susan Sloane 6–3, 7–6(7–3)
 It was Medvedeva's first singles title of her career.

Doubles
 Kathy Jordan /  Larisa Neiland defeated  Brenda Schultz /  Caroline Vis 6–1, 6–2

References

External links
 ITF tournament edition details
 Tournament draws

Virginia Slims of Nashville
Virginia Slims of Nashville
Virginia Slims of Nashville
Virginia Slims of Nashville
Virginia Slims of Nashville
Virginia Slims of Nashville